Predel Point (‘Nos Predel’ \'nos pre-'del\) is a point on the northwest coast of Fournier Bay in Anvers Island in the Palmer Archipelago, Antarctica separating the termini of Rhesus Glacier to the north and Thamyris Glacier 4 km to the south.

The point is named after Predel Saddle  between the mountains of Pirin and Rila in southwestern Bulgaria.

Location
British mapping in 1980.

Maps
 British Antarctic Territory. Scale 1:200000 topographic map No. 3217. DOS 610 - W 64 62. Tolworth, UK, 1980.
Antarctic Digital Database (ADD). Scale 1:250000 topographic map of Antarctica. Scientific Committee on Antarctic Research (SCAR). Since 1993, regularly upgraded and updated.

References
 Predel Point. SCAR Composite Gazetteer of Antarctica
 Bulgarian Antarctic Gazetteer. Antarctic Place-names Commission. (details in Bulgarian, basic data in English)

External links
 Predel Point. Copernix satellite image

Headlands of the Palmer Archipelago
Bulgaria and the Antarctic